Bay FM (callsign 4BAY) is a community radio station serving Redland City in Brisbane. The not-for-profit Bayside Community Radio Association Inc. was founded in 1987 and test transmissions took place in 1989 and 1991. It was granted a community broadcasting licence in 1992 and transmissions commenced in October of that year, becoming a 24-hour operation the following month. The studio is in Thornlands.

See also
 List of radio stations in Australia

References

External links
 Official site

Community radio stations in Australia
Radio stations in Brisbane
Radio stations established in 1992